is a Japanese yaoi manga artist from Nagoya. She has also provided illustrations for several yaoi light novels by other authors, including The Guilty by Katsura Izumi. Most of her works have been translated into English and German (chiefly by Tokyopop imprints). Her influences include Suzue Miuchi, Yun Koga and Range Murata.

Biography
Hinako Takanaga was born on September 16 in Nagoya, Aichi, Japan. Her first manga story, was published by Hanamaru Comics in 1995. As the story continued it was later retitled Challengers, and it spawned a spinoff series titled The Tyrant Falls in Love. She currently lives in Osaka.

She was a guest at Yaoi-Con in 2007 and 2010, invited by Digital Manga Publishing, the US publishers of her popular series Little Butterfly and The Tyrant Falls in Love.

Bibliography

Manga
 , 1995, 4 volumes
 , 1999, 1 volume (This work has an English subtitle; as of September 2011 it is not licensed in English.)
 , 2001, 3 volumes
 Love Round!!, 2002, 1 volume
 , 2003, 1 volume
 , 2004, 1 volume
 , 2004, 1 volume; English title A Capable Man
 , 2004, 6 volumes (completed)
 , 2004, 8+ volumes (ongoing)
 , 2005, 1 volume
 , 2005, 1 volume
 , 2006, 3 volumes
 , 2007, 1 volume
 , 2011 (completed)

Illustrations
The Guilty Series, by 
, English title The Guilty Vol. 1: Verdict, 2002
, English title The Guilty Vol. 2: Original Sin, 2002
, English title The Guilty Vol. 3: Redemption, 2003
, English title The Guilty Vol. 4: Forsaken, 2004

Shirasagi Series, by 
, 2005
, 2005
, 2006
, 2007
, 2007
, 2008

Shinkan Series, by 
, 2005
, 2007
, 2007
, 2010

References

External links
Official website 
Official blog 

Ed Chavez podcast interview

Living people
Year of birth missing (living people)
Manga artists from Aichi Prefecture
Women manga artists
Japanese illustrators
Japanese female comics artists
Female comics writers
Japanese women writers